The women's 80 metres hurdles event at the 1966 British Empire and Commonwealth Games was held on 11 and 13 August at the Independence Park in Kingston, Jamaica. It was the last time that the distance was contested at the Games later replaced by the 100 metres hurdles.

Medalists

Results

Heats

Qualification: First 4 in each heat (Q) qualify directly for the final.Wind:Heat 1: ? m/s, Heat 2: +0.5 m/s

Final

Wind: 0.0 m/s

References

Athletics at the 1966 British Empire and Commonwealth Games
1966